Coşkun Can Aktan (born 1963) is a political economist and a professor at the Faculty of Economics and Management at Dokuz Eylül University in İzmir, Turkey. He is founder and honorary chairman of the Social Sciences Research Society.  Aktan is a leading expert on the privatization of the Turkish economy, analyzing and writing on the movement of Turkey from a statist to a market economy from its early days, making Aktan an early and internationally known source of information on Turkey's move toward a market-based economy.

Professor Aktan is now leading the Center for Law and Economics founded by himself.

Academic career 

Coskun Can Aktan is currently a professor at the Faculty of Economics and Management at the Dokuz Eylül University. He worked at several international research centers and universities including the Center for Study of Public Choice, George Mason University, United States; Economics Department of the University of California (UCLA); International Social Sciences Institute of the University of Edinburgh; Institut für Allgemeine für Wirtschaftsforschung of the University of Freiburg (Germany); University of Vrije, Belgium and Mount Kenya University, Kenya as a visiting scholar.

Aktan's research studies were funded by the fellowships and the grants of such organizations as Higher Education Institution of Turkey, Turkish Scientific and Technical Research Institution (TÜBİTAK), Turkish Sciences Academy (TÜBA), George Mason University Foundation (United States), Earhart Foundation (United States), British Council (UK), German Academic Exchange Service (DAAD) (Germany), Friedrich-Naumann Foundation (Germany), Japan Foundation (Japan) etc.

Fields 

Public Finance / Public Economics / Public Choice / Constitutional Economics / Institutional Economics / Political Economy /

Scholarship/fellowship 

 Japan Society for the Promotion of Science Grant. (Japan Economic Policy Association, JEPA)
 Turkish Academy of Sciences (TUBA). (University of California, Los Angeles Economics Department / visiting scholar.
 Friedrich Naumann Foundation Fellowship. (Albert Ludwigs University and Walter Eucken Institute in Freiburg / Visiting Scholar.
 DAAD (Deutscher Akademischer Austauschdienst) Fellowship. (Albert Ludwigs University and Walter Eucken Institute in Freiburg / visiting scholar.
 British Council Fellowship. (International Social Science Institute, University of Edinburgh as an honorary visiting associate.
 Earhart Foundation Grant. (the Center for Study of Public Choice, George Mason University. / visiting scholar)
 Dissertation fellowship from Higher Education Board, Turkey as well as a supplementary fund from the Center for Study of Public Choice, George Mason University, United States. the Center for Study of Public Choice as a visiting graduate student.

Academic Performance

 Professor Coskun Can Aktan has an H index = 50, Total citations = 11,625, is the primary author for six papers with over 100 cites, and has been publishing since at least 1987 per Google scholar. He passes WP:PROF. Retrieved August 28, 2022. Note: be sure to use Google Scholar if necessary.
 Professor Coskun Can Aktan has a Top Read Score (865,732) at ResearchGate, one of the highest among social scientists. Retrieved August 28, 2022. Note: Reads is a simple metric designed to show you exactly how often research is being accessed on ResearchGate, in real time.

External links
C. C. Aktan official web
C. C. Aktan Personal Home Page

Turkish economists
People from İzmir
Living people
1963 births
Earhart Foundation Fellows